Hoyt may refer to:

Places

Canada
Hoyt, New Brunswick

United States
Hoyt, Colorado
Hoyt, Kansas
Hoyt, West Virginia
Hoyt, Wisconsin
Hoyt Peak, a mountain in Yellowstone National Park, Wyoming

Other uses
Hoyt (name)
Hoyt Archery, a bow manufacturer in Salt Lake City, Utah, U.S.
Hoyt model, for urban land use
Hoyts, an Australian group of companies
Swartwout–Hoyt scandal, a political scandal that occurred in the year 1829

See also
 Hoit (disambiguation)